Rosen Peak is a peak rising to 1220 m in the south part of Gross Hills, Heritage Range, Ellsworth Mountains. It was named by the Advisory Committee on Antarctic Names (US-ACAN) (2004) after Lawrence C. Rosen, a geologist on the United States Antarctic Research Program (USARP) Ellsworth Mountains expedition of 1979–80.

See also
 Mountains in Antarctica

References

 

Ellsworth Mountains
Mountains of Ellsworth Land